The 1900–01 Holy Cross Crusaders men's basketball team represented The College of the Holy Cross during the 1900–01 college men's basketball season. The team finished with an overall record of 6–6.

Schedule

|-

References

Holy Cross Crusaders men's basketball seasons
Holy Cross